John Morgan Cobbett (13 November 1800 – 13 February 1877) was a Conservative Party and Liberal Party politician.

Trained as a barrister, he was the second son of the English pamphleteer, farmer, journalist and Member of Parliament William Cobbett, author of Rural Rides (1830) and his wife Anne née Reid. In 1851, he married Mary Fielden, the daughter of John Fielden, his father's fellow-member for Oldham.

John Morgan Cobbett's political affiliations are complicated. He had stood unsuccessfully at Oldham on an all-Radical "plague on both your houses" slate with John Fielden in 1847. He was elected in 1852 as the Radical half of an explicit Radical-Tory alliance. At the 1857 election, he was opposed by two Liberals and denied that he had sold out to Palmerston, asserting that the Liberal Chief Whip had no confidence in him.  In 1865 he stood unsuccessfully in conjunction with a Conservative, opposed by two Liberals.

Nonetheless, from 1852 to 1865, outside Oldham he was generally taken to be a Liberal.  He contested Oldham as a Conservative in 1868 (unsuccessfully) and was elected as a Conservative at a by-election in 1872 - and was thereby the last MP in the UK to be elected by public (rather than secret) ballot. From 1872 to his death in 1877, he sat as a Conservative (but one calling for annual Parliaments and manhood suffrage).

He is buried in a family plot at the West Street Cemetery in Farnham in Surrey.

References

External links
 

1800 births
1877 deaths
Conservative Party (UK) MPs for English constituencies
Liberal Party (UK) MPs for English constituencies
UK MPs 1852–1857
UK MPs 1857–1859
UK MPs 1859–1865
UK MPs 1868–1874
UK MPs 1874–1880